Thyenula arcana is a jumping spider species that lives in Zimbabwe. The female was described in 2008. Originally named Tularosa arcana, it was moved to the genus Thyenula in 2014.

References

Salticidae
Spiders described in 2008
Spiders of Africa
Endemic fauna of Zimbabwe
Taxa named by Wanda Wesołowska